HC Meshkov Brest (Myashkov Brest, officially A. P. Myashkow Brest Handball Club) is a handball club from Brest, Belarus. They currently compete in the Belarusian First League of Handball, in the SEHA League and competed in the EHF Champions League. 

The club is named in honor of Anatol Piatrovich Myashkow (Meshkov), promoter of handball in Belarus and sports enthusiast.

Crest, colours, supporters

Kits

Accomplishments

Belarusian First League 
 Champion (14x): 2004, 2005, 2006, 2007, 2008, 2014, 2015, 2016, 2017, 2018, 2019, 2020, 2021, 2022.
 Runners-up (5x): 2003, 2009, 2010, 2011, 2012
Belarusian cup
 Champion (13x): 2004, 2005, 2007, 2008, 2009, 2011, 2014, 2015, 2016, 2017, 2018, 2020, 2021
SEHA League 
 Champion (1х): 2013

Performance history

Team

Current squad
Squad for the 2022–23 season

Goalkeepers
1  Denis Zabolotin
 21  Ilya Usik
Left Wingers
 14  Andrei Yurynok
 35  Eduard Yarosh
Right Wingers
 24  Maksim Baranau
 25  Danila Viarheichyk
Line players
 19  Eduard Klimenko
 22  Viachaslau Shumak
 42  Artsiom Selviasiuk
 44  Aleh Tarasevich
 78  Pavel Andreev

Left Backs
5  Zhang Jianjie
 28  Aliaksei Shynkel
Central Backs
8  Alexei Solovev
 10  Aliaksandr Padshyvalau
 18  Marko Matijaševič
 88  Valiantsin Kuran
Right Backs
4  Yahor Budzeika
 17  Dmitry Artamonov
 31  Mikalai Aliokhin

Notable players
  Ivan Matskevich
  Andrei Yurynok
  Mikita Vailupau
  Dzmitry Kamyshyk
  Dzmitry Nikulenkau
  Siarhei Shylovich
  Viachaslau Shumak
  Maxim Babichev
  Vladimir Vranješ
  Vladimir Božić
  Ivan Pešić
  Robert Markotić
  Pavel Horák (handballer)
  William Accambray
  Baptiste Bonnefond
  Dainis Kristopans
  Alexander Shkurinskiy
  Pavel Atman
  Pavel Bashkin
  Simon Razgor
  Jaka Malus
  Staš Skube
  Miloš Kostadinović
  Rastko Stojković

Notable former coaches
  Gintaras Savukynas
  Željko Babić
  Serhiy Bebeshko
  Manolo Cadenas
  Raúl Alonso

References

External links
 Official website 
 Official website 

Belarusian handball clubs
Sport in Brest, Belarus